Kewpie Morgan (born Horace Allen Morgan, February 1, 1892 – September 24, 1956) was an American silent film comedian who also performed in a few early sound films. He appeared in 99 films from 1915 to 1936. He appeared in the films of such comedians as Buster Keaton and Laurel and Hardy. He posthumously appeared in Robert Youngson compilations of the 1960s highlighting silent film comedy.

Before he became an actor, Morgan was an electrician at a film studio. He sometimes returned to that job when acting opportunities were not available.

Partial filmography
The Border Legion (1918)
The Cup of Fury (1920)
Merely Mary Ann (1920)
Drag Harlan (1920)
The Scuttlers (1920)
A Small Town Idol (1921)
Three Ages (1923)
Sherlock Jr. (1924)
Stupid, But Brave (1924)
Butter Fingers (1925)
The Better 'Ole (1926)
Spuds (1927)
 Finnegan's Ball (1927)
Flying Luck (1927)
Beggars of Life (1928)
The Spieler (1928)
 Square Shoulders (1929)
The Aviator (1929)
The Rogue Song (1930)
Other Men's Women (1931)
Babes in Toyland (1934)

References

External links

1892 births
1956 deaths
Male actors from Texas
20th-century American male actors
American male silent film actors
People from Anna, Texas